

The Yakovlev Yak-53 was a single seat aerobatic trainer aircraft produced in the USSR during 1981/2. Only one prototype was produced.

Development
The prototype Yak-53 was derived from the Yak-52, differing in being a single seater designed as an aerobatic trainer. The front cockpit was deleted and the canopy modified to suit. The cockpit used the flying controls of the Yak-50 without the spring loading of the Yak-52, and the use of the undercarriage and tankage of the prototype Yak-52 to save weight, making the Yak-53 100 kg (220 lb) lighter than the Yak-52.

Operational history
The prototype Yak-53 set two world records for time to height in its class on 15 February and 23 February 1982. Some sources state that a 3-bladed propeller of western origin was used for the record setting flights.

Specifications (Yak-53)

References

Further reading
 

1970s Soviet civil trainer aircraft
1970s Soviet military trainer aircraft
Yak-053
Aerobatic aircraft